Goodbye Summer may refer to:

Books
 Goodbye Summer, by Alison Prince 1983 
 The Goodbye Summer, by Crosby Bonsall 1979 
 The Goodbye Summer, by  Patricia Gaffney 2004
 Goodbye summer blues, by Philip Prowse 1995

Film and TV
 Goodbye Summer, 1914 film directed by Van Dyke Brooke

Music
 Goodbye Summer EP, by False Start (band)
 "Goodbye Summer" (Danielle Bradbery and Thomas Rhett song), 2018
 "Goodbye Summer", a 2013 song by Jonny Fritz from Dad Country
 "Goodbye Summer", a 2013 song by f(x) from Pink Tape
 "Goodbye Summer", a 1963 song by Joanie Sommers
 "Goodbye Summer", a 1970 song by Peter Lee Stirling